Filmore is a neighborhood of the city of New Orleans.  A subdistrict of the Gentilly District Area, its boundaries as defined by the City Planning Commission are: * Allen Toussaint Boulevard to the north, London Avenue Canal to the east, Press Drive, Paris Avenue and Harrison Avenue to the south and Bayou St. John to the west.

Geography

Adjacent Neighborhoods
 Lake Terrace/Lake Oaks (north)
 St. Anthony (east)
 Dillard (east)
 St. Bernard Projects (south)
 City Park (west)

Boundaries
The City Planning Commission defines the boundaries of Filmore as these streets: * Allen Toussaint Boulevard, London Avenue Canal, Press Drive, Paris Avenue, Harrison Avenue and Bayou St. John.

Demographics
As of the census of 2000, there were 6,983 people, 2,757 households, and 1,892 families residing in the neighborhood.  The population density was 5,868 /mi2 (2,253 /km2).

As of the census of 2010, there were 4,227 people, 1,654 households, and 1,087 families residing in the neighborhood.

See also
 New Orleans neighborhoods
 Gentilly, New Orleans

References

Neighborhoods in New Orleans